The Polestar 2 is a battery electric 5-door liftback produced by the Swedish automaker Volvo under its Polestar sub-brand. Based on the CMA platform, production began in March 2020 at the Luqiao CMA Super Factory in Luqiao, Zhejiang, China.

Overview 

The concept car that precedes its design was called the Volvo Concept 40.2. It was designed by Thomas Ingenlath alongside the Volvo Concept 40.1, which later became the basis of the XC40. These two concept cars were both unveiled in 2016. However, Volvo decided to shift their focus to small crossovers later that year. Therefore, Polestar picked the 40.2 as the basis for their Polestar 2 design. Volvo's exterior design chief Maximilian Missoni tweaked the car's taillights, grille, and wheels in order to differentiate it as a standalone vehicle. The Polestar 2 is also the first car with Google's Android Automotive operating system built in.

Polestar 2 is the second car under the Polestar brand after the Polestar 1. Polestar 1 is however a plug-in hybrid and limited production vehicle, making the Polestar 2 the first battery electric vehicle and mass production Polestar vehicle in the Volvo Car Group.

The production version was officially unveiled on 27 February 2019 during an internet livestream and made its first public appearance at the 2019 Geneva Motor Show that month. The car has a starting suggested retail price of US$49,900 as of October 2021. For the 2022 model year, Polestar announced that additional options would be available for the Polestar 2.

2024 facelift
An updated Polestar 2 was revealed in January 2023 for the 2024 model year, with rear-wheel drive becoming the standard drivetrain for the entry-level model instead of the previous front-wheel drive.

Safety 

The Polestar 2 is designed to protect the battery pack during an impact and automatically disconnect it after a collision. On both front ends a SPOC (Severe Partial Overlap Crash) block is attached to mitigate the crash forces and prevent any material entering the occupant compartment. The Polestar 2 also features a centre airbag to protect from far-side impacts.

The Polestar 2 obtained a 5-star 2021 Euro NCAP rating with a 92% score for protection of adults, 89% for protection of children, 80% for protection of vulnerable road users and 86% for safety assist.

Recall 
In October 2020, Polestar issued a recall on all Polestar 2 models due to a software defect that caused loss of power to the vehicle whilst driving. As the vehicles were not capable of OTA software updates at that time it required all of the vehicles to be recalled to a service centre for a manual software update.

Later the same month a second recall was issued due to faulty inverters.

Specifications 

From September 2021 to March 2022, the Polestar 2 Single Motor Standard Range with a 64 kWh battery and 165 kW power, 224 hp was available in Europe. The battery for this version was made by CATL. The 64 kWh and 165 kW power version is available until now in China, as the only Single Motor Standard Range version.

Environment 

Delivery 
Polestar's factory is located in Chengdu, China. At least all cars for the European market get shipped to Shanghai, China, by train. In Shanghai, the car gets placed on a boat to Zeebrugge, Belgium. In Zeebrugge, the European cars get approved after European new-car rules before getting shipped to the destination country.

References

External links 

 

Cars introduced in 2019
Polestar vehicles
Compact executive cars
All-wheel-drive vehicles
Euro NCAP executive cars
2020s cars
Production electric cars